The Williamson River is a minor river in the South Island of New Zealand.

It lies within the borders of the Mount Aspiring National Park and feeds into the Arawhata River.

Rivers of the West Coast, New Zealand
Mount Aspiring National Park
Rivers of New Zealand
Westland District